Calling from a Country Phone is the second album by former Go-Between Robert Forster, and his first self-produced disc. Drummer Glenn Thompson would later join Forster and Grant McLennan in a reformed Go-Betweens years later. The album also features Custard frontman David McCormack on lead guitar.

Details

Forster had recently returned to Australia from Germany. "I came back with an agenda, because I had an album written. I wanted to come back and find some musicians in Brisbane, and I wanted to record it probably at Sunshine. There wasn't a better studio in town."

Forster was unsure where to find local musicians. He said, "So I went to the one place in Brisbane where, if you’re a little bit disoriented, you’re looking for information, you’re looking for people – there’s only one place you can go. So I walked into Rockinghorse Records, and I said to Warwick Vere – who’s run the shop since 1975 – 'I need a band. I need some young musicians around town.' He told me to go to the Queens Arms on a Sunday night, down there on James Street. I walked in and there was a band on stage called COW. " COW (Country or Western) were a Bob Moore band that featured Dave McCormack from Custard and future member of the Go-Betweens and Custard, Glenn Thompson. As Forster's backing band, they toured under the name the Silver Backwash.

Reception 

Lisa Kearns, writing in the Melbourne Age of Forster’s ‘idiosyncratic brilliance’, praised the album as a ‘softly glowing, moody, and many-faceted concoction that gathers memories from the years Forster spent travelling the globe, from Los Angeles to Berlin.’

Track listing

All songs written by Robert Forster.
"Atlanta Lie Low" – 3:13
"121" – 3:28
"The Circle" – 3:45
"Falling Star" – 4:05
"I Want to Be Quiet" – 3:34

"Cat's Life" – 3:52
"Girl to a World" – 4:18
"Drop" – 4:08
"Beyond Their Law" – 5:03
"Forever & Time" – 2:48

Personnel

Robert Forster – guitar, vocals
John Bone – violin, piano, organ
David McCormack – guitar
Robert Moore – bass
Dallas Southam – pedal steel, acoustic guitar
Glenn Thompson – drums

References

1993 albums
Robert Forster (musician) albums
Beggars Banquet Records albums